Florinda Ciardi is an Italian former footballer who played as a midfielder for Verona C.F.

International career
Ciardi was also part of the Italian team at the 1997 European Championships.

Honours

Club 
Verona C.F.
 Serie A : 1995–96

References

Italian women's footballers
Serie A (women's football) players
Italy women's international footballers
Women's association football midfielders